Gyanendra Deuja (born 5 May 1967) is a Nepali film director and screenwriter. He directed his first movie, Rakshak, in 1997. It contained the first instance of an underwater action scene in a Nepali movie. He then started adding a novelty to each of his movies. One of his notable movies is Muna Madan based on the long poem of the same name by Laxmi Prasad Devkota. This movie was Nepal's submission for Best Foreign Language Film at the 2004 Oscars.  As of May 2016, he was shooting his latest film, Buddha - born in Nepal, which is a story of a struggling Nepali student In America.

Early life 
Gyanendra Deuja was born in Kapan, Nepal. He is the youngest of Mr. Dev Bahadur Deuja and Late Mrs. Kanchhi Deuja's four children. He has two sisters and a brother. His father is a farmer and a  Nepalese Army veteran. He went to school at the Pashupati School in Chabahil, and to college at the Nepal Commerce Campus in Minbhawan.

He is married to Rosani Adhikari Deuja. He has a son, Sulav Pratik Deuja and a daughter,  Samikshya Deuja. Apart from being a screenwriter and director, Mr. Deuja is also a professional banker, having been the deputy Director of Nepal Rastra Bank since 1988.

When he was still an undergraduate, he worked in the theater called Aarohan (nepali:आरोहण), now Gurukul (nepali: गुरुकुल), where he got acquainted with senior actors and directors, such as Sunil Pokharel, Saroj Khanal, Badri Adhikari, Narayan Puri and so on.

Career 
With the establishment of Nepal television in the early 1980s, many of the theater artists transitioned to making soap opera. He started taking minor roles and working as production assistant as well. 
when he was doing some educational awareness program for the TV, he met Resh Raj Acharya - a senior movie director who later mentored him. Mr. Deuja worked as chief assistant director in tele-serials like Sparsh, Dushman, Aama, etc. and celluloid feature films like Tuhuro, Bandhan, Aama with Mr. Acharya.

His first directorial venture was Rakshak (1997) which had scenes shot under water, a novelty in Nepali Cinema. He has since built a reputation for innovative experiments in his  movies. His films are usually based on contemporary social issues. Rakshak was highly controversial for depicting maoist issues during the Maoist insurgency. The movie was followed by Gorkhali and Dagbatti in the late nineties and early 2000s. Then, he did Muna Madan based on an epic love poem by the great poet Lakshmi Prasad Devkota (Nepali: महाकवि लक्ष्मीप्रसाद देवकोटा). It was selected as Nepal's entry to the 76th Academy Awards in 2004 in the "Best Foreign Language Film" category. It was also screened at Palm Springs Film Festival the same year.

Deuja is a graduate of Tribhuvan University. He graduated as a Bachelor of Commerce.

He has worked as deputy director of Nepal Rastra Bank since 1988.

Filmography

Television 
Deuja has also done work in television:
 Golmaal,
 Aankna Khulyo,
 Ghaito Ma Gham,
 Shayogi,
 Asal Upaya,
 Kamaiya.

Awards 

·      Nomination of Muna-Madan in 76thOscar Awards-2003

·      Participated in Palm springs  film festival- 2004

·      Prakash Thapa Memorial Award- 2007 Awarded for the most successful Director of the Year for the movie Dewar-Babu (from Nepal films producers association)

·      KTV Film Award -2008 Awarded as the Best Director for the movie Dewar-Babu.

·      5th NEFTA TTV  Award-2011 Nominated in Best director category for  the movie Rana-Sangram.

·      Samjhana digital film award- 2010 Nominated in Best Director category for the movie Hifajat

References

External links 
 
 Interview - Gyanendra Deuja

1967 births
Living people
People from Kathmandu District
Nepalese film directors
21st-century Nepalese screenwriters
20th-century Nepalese screenwriters
21st-century Nepalese film directors
20th-century Nepalese film directors